ŽFK Biljanini Izvori (Macedonian: Женски фудбалски клуб Билјанини Извори, meaning Biljanini springs) is a women's football club from Ohrid, North Macedonia. Founded in 2010, the team started directly in the Macedonian women's football championship. The team won its first championship in 2012–13 and played in the 2013–14 UEFA Women's Champions League qualifying round losing all three matches.

History
The club was renamed from Ohrigjanki to Biljanini Izvori in 2010.  After two-time Macedonian champion ZFK Naše Taksi dissolved in 2012, many of its players moved to Biljanini Izvori.

The championship was won in 2012/13. The very next season, 2013/14 Biljanini finished bottom of the table.

Titles
 Macedonian women's football championship: 2012–13

UEFA Competitions Record
The 2013–14 season will be the first in UEFA competitions for the team.

References

External links
Facebook profile

Women's football clubs in North Macedonia
Association football clubs established in 2010
Sport in Ohrid